Erick Morikawa is a construction worker who successfully counterfeited Las Vegas casino chips until he was eventually caught.

The scheme
At first, Morikawa attempted to fabricate counterfeit chips from scratch, but this proves too difficult.  Eventually, he and his colleagues developed a method to convert low denomination chips into higher denomination chips.  As a result of this scheme, casinos began to incorporate RFID technology into their chips.

Morikawa and his associates are one of the only successful counterfeiters of Las Vegas casino chips in history.

References

American counterfeiters